Dumitru Corbea (born Dumitru Cobzaru; September 6, 1910 – March 26, 2002) was a Romanian poet and prose writer.

Born in Sârbi, Botoșani County, his parents Dumitru Cobzaru and Ecaterina (née Filipescu) were peasants. After completing elementary school in his native village in 1925, he finished the lower-level course at the Botoșani A. T. Laurian High School in 1929, followed by the superior commercial school in the same town in 1935. Arrested in 1937 and in 1940 and send before a military court, he was acquitted. His pen name was Dumitru Corbea until 1945, when it also became his official name.

His first publication was the 1929 poetry brochure Poezii patriotice. Then he wrotebooks of poems (Război, 1937; Nu sunt cântăreț de stele, 1940; Poezii, 1945; Hrisovul meu, 1947; Pentru inima ce arde, 1955; Poezii, 1962), a travel account (De peste mări și țări, 1959), novels (Singura cale, 1946; Așa am învățat carte, 1955; Primejdia, 1976), autobiographical prose (Puntea, 1963; Bădia, 1966; Sufletul cuvintelor 1984) and memoirs (Memorii, 1982; Mărturisiri, 1987). He was a frequent participant in the Sburătorul literary circle. His work appeared in Cuvântul liber, Dreptatea, Viața Românească, Vremea, Azi, Contemporanul, Flacăra, Iașul literar, România Literară, Tribuna and Albina. He wrote the history play Bălceștii (1948) and the film script for Barbu Lăutaru (1954). The volumes Anotimpuri (1956) and Ritm și viteză (1980) collect travel notes, conferences, articles and reportages. He died in Bucharest.

Notes

1910 births
2002 deaths
People from Botoșani County
20th-century Romanian poets
Romanian novelists
Romanian memoirists
Romanian travel writers
Romanian screenwriters
Romanian male poets
20th-century Romanian male writers
20th-century screenwriters
20th-century memoirists